Environment friendly processes, or environmental-friendly processes (also referred to as eco-friendly, nature-friendly, and green), are sustainability and marketing terms referring to goods and services, laws, guidelines and policies that claim reduced, minimal, or no harm upon ecosystems or the environment.

Companies use these ambiguous terms to promote goods and services, sometimes with additional, more specific certifications, such as ecolabels. Their overuse can be referred to as greenwashing. To ensure the successful meeting of Sustainable Development Goals (SDGs) companies are advised to employ environmental friendly processes in their production. Specifically, Sustainable Development Goal 12 measures 11 targets and 13 indicators "to ensure sustainable consumption and production patterns".

The International Organization for Standardization has developed ISO 14020 and ISO 14024 to establish principles and procedures for environmental labels and declarations that certifiers and eco-labellers should follow. In particular, these standards relate to the avoidance of financial conflicts of interest, the use of sound scientific methods and accepted test procedures, and openness and transparency in the setting of standards.

Regional variants

Europe 
Products located in members of the European Union can use the EU Ecolabel pending the EU's approval. EMAS is another EU label that signifies whether an organization management is green as opposed to the product. Germany also uses the Blue Angel, based on Germany's standard.

In Europe, there are many different ways that companies are using environmentally friendly processes, eco-friendly labels, and overall changing guidelines to ensure that there is less harm being done to the environment and ecosystems while their products are being made. In Europe, for example, many companies are already using EMAS labels to show that their products are friendly.

Companies 

Although these labels evidently help the environment, many companies in Europe make putting eco-labels on their products a top-priority since it can result to an increase in sales. For example, sales in certain products such as food tend to have more sales when there are eco-labels on these products. In Europe specifically, a study was conducted that shows a connection between eco-labels and the purchasing of fish. In the study, "Our results show a significant connection between the desire for eco-labeling and seafood features, especially the freshness of the fish, the geographical origin of the fish and the wild vs farmed origin of the fish". This analysis article shows that eco-labels are not only reflecting a positive impact on the environment when it comes to creating and preserving products, but also to increase more sales. Many companies can therefore use these consumer preferences to their advantage if they wish to receive more sales. However, not every country in Europe is in agreement on whether certain products, specifically fish, should have eco-labels. In the same analysis article, the following is mentioned: "Surprisingly, the country effect on the probability of accepting a fish eco-label is tricky to interpret. The countries with the highest level of eco-labeling acceptability are Belgium and France". According to the same analysis and statistics, France and Belgium are most likely of accepting these eco-labels. The hope of these same analyzers is for all countries in Europe to accept these labels, since these labels show proof of healthily-produced products that can't harm the consumer or the environment.

During economy crisis 

Although many companies are striving for environmentally-friendly factories, productions and consumerisms, some companies are being less environmentally-friendly as well. However, not all companies are choosing to be less environmentally-friendly by choice, as there are many outside factors that can effect companies' decisions to go eco-friendly and use eco-labels (if legally able to use) as well. For instance, in 2015, many companies were subject to an economic crisis that effected many companies abilities to develop, produce, and sell products. As a result, many companies has to switch to alternative production methods, as stated in this study analysis, "Since the current economic crisis emerged, the priorities of business have changed and liquidity management has become one of the most important aspects to consider in each decision. Therefore, financial difficulties have forced firms to redefine their business and implement austerity plans as a unique alternative to survive. They have therefore reduced expenses". As a result of the financial crisis, many companies had to cut production costs. This therefore meant that many companies had to rely on production methods that were not environmentally-friendly at all in order to survive the crisis, even though many companies most likely did not favor these decisions.

In Europe, overall, there are many companies that are aiming for implementing eco-labels and environmentally-safe and friendly procedures into the productions of their products. Not only does this keep the environment safe, but it also ensures that products are safe and that consumers will be safe when consuming certain products, such as food, electricity, and more. Although not every country in Europe may currently agree with the additions of eco-labels to products, there has been a steady increase of implementing these labels over the course of the last 20 years. Plus, although there may also be crises that can occur in Europe that can result in companies shifting away from environmentally-friendly procedures for a while, it does not particularly mean that companies don't not stand for environmentally-safe productions, since many companies only shift away as a means of surviving the crisis. Overall, Europe is implementing many ways to stay environmentally-safe that is slowly being enforced overtime, which have many results for the environment as well as sales.

North America 
In the United States, environmental marketing claims require caution. Ambiguous titles such as environmentally friendly can be confusing without a specific definition; some regulators are providing guidance. The United States Environmental Protection Agency has deemed some ecolabels misleading in determining whether a product is truly "green".

In Canada, one label is that of the Environmental Choice Program. Created in 1988, only products approved by the program are allowed to display the label.

Overall, Mexico was one of the first countries in the world to pass a specific law on climate change. The law set an obligatory target of reducing national greenhouse-gas emissions by 30% by 2020. The country also has a National Climate Change Strategy, which is intended to guide policymaking over the next 40 years.

Oceania 
The Energy Rating Label is a Type III label that provides information on "energy service per unit of energy consumption". It was first created in 1986, but negotiations led to a redesign in 2000.

As written in the article found on MPDI Open Access Journals, "This region has one of the highest per capita generations of e-waste, as well as one of the lowest recycling rates. Despite being the lowest e-waste generating region globally..." This sentence brings forward the idea of the lack of effort Oceania had when it came to trying to properly expose e-waste. Oceania consisting of Australia, New Zealand, Melanesia, Micronesia, and Polynesia generates the second most e-waste, 16.1 kg, while having the third lowest recycling rate of 8.8%. Out of Oceania, only Australia has a policy in policy to manage e-waste, that being the Policy Stewardship Act published in 2011 that aimed to manage the impact of products, mainly those in reference to the disposal of products and their waste. Under the Act the National Television and Computer Recycling Scheme (NTCRS) was created, which forced manufactures and importers of electrical and electronic equipment (EEE) importing 5000 or more products or 15000 or more peripherals be liable and required to pay the NTCRS for retrieving and recycling materials from electronic products.

New Zealand does not have any law that directly manages their e-waste, instead they have voluntary product stewardship schemes such as supplier trade back and trade-in schemes and voluntary recycling drop-off points. Though this has helped it costs the provider money with labor taking up 90% of the cost of recycling. In addition, e-waste is currently not considered a priority product, which would encourage the enforcement of product stewardship. In Pacific Island Regions (PIR) e-waste management is a hard task since they lack the adequate amount of land to properly dispose of it even though they produce one of the lowest amounts of e-waste in the world due to their income and population. Due to this there are large stockpiles of waste unable to be recycled safely.

At the moment The Secretariat of the Pacific Regional Environment Program (SPREP), an organization in charge of managing the natural resources and environment of the Pacific region, is in charge of region coordination and managing the e-waste of the Oceania region. SPREP uses Cleaner Pacific 2025 as a framework to guide the various governments in the region. They also work with PacWaste (Pacific Hazardous Waste) to identify and resolve the different issues with waste management of the islands, which largely stem from the lack of government enforcement and knowledge on the matter. They have currently proposed a mandatory product stewardship policy be put in place along with an advance recycling fee which would incentivize local and industrial recycling. They are also in the mindset that the islands should collaborate and share resources and experience to assist in the endeavor.

With the help from the NTCRS, though the situation has improved they have been vocal about the responsibilities of stakeholders in the situation and how they need to be more clearly defined. In addition to there being a differences in state and federal regulations, with only Southern Australia, Australian Capital Territory, and Victoria having banned e-waste landfill, it would be possible to make this apply the rest of the region if a federal decision was made. They have also advocated for reasonable access to collection points for waste, with there being only one collection point within a 100 km radius in some cases. It has been shown that the reason some residents don't recycle is because of their distance from a collection point. In addition, there have been few campaigns to recycle, with the company, MobileMuster, a voluntary collection program managed by the Australian Mobile Telecommunication Association, aimed to collect phones before they went to a landfill and has been doing so since 1999. Upon further study, it was found that only 46% of the public was award of the program, which later increased to 74% in 2018, but this was after an investment of $45 million from the Australian Mobile Telecommunication Association.

Asia 
Asia's continuous advancements have led to, "Economic growth in Asia has increased in the past three decades and has heightened energy demand, resulting in rising greenhouse gas emissions and severe air pollution. To tackle these issues, fuel switching and the deployment of renewables are essential." However, as countries continue to advance it leads to more pollution being emitted as a result as more energy is being used for different purposes as there's become a huge need for it which has led to the environment being put aside instead of being made a priority. This is especially true when taking into consideration how as the economy continues to flourish the market grows substantially which causes a demand for energy leading to higher contamination within the environment as a result. In recent years, the biggest concern for Asia is its "...air pollution issues. Major Chinese cities such as Beijing have received the worst air quality rankings (Li et al., 2017). Seoul, the capital of South Korea, also suffers from air pollution (Kim et al., 2017). Currently, Indian cities such as Mumbai and Delhi are overtaking Chinese cities in the ranking of worst air quality. In 2019, 21 of the world's 30 cities with the worst air quality were in India.1." The air quality has become so deteriorated within Asia due to the high pollution several countries in Asia emit which only lowers the air quality of the region. It's become an increasing problem as the years go by, especially within Asia as it continues to advance, but at the cost of the environment itself. This just leads to both countries and cities being negatively impacted by the dreadful air quality as citizens continue to breathe in polluted air constantly.

The environmentally friendly trends are marketed with a different color association, using the color blue for clean air and clean water, as opposed to green in western cultures. Japanese- and Korean-built hybrid vehicles use the color blue instead of green all throughout the vehicle, and use the word "blue" indiscriminately.

Central Asia 

In Central Asia there are multiple problems when it comes to the environment including, "...the loss of biodiversity and the complexity of the network of protected natural areas; insufficient levels of municipal solid waste processing; energy efficiency problems, in particular, the deterioration of the energy production and supply system; the imbalance between hydropower, irrigated agriculture and the environment; and problems of the Aral Sea." This is a detrimental problem as the environment is becoming negatively impacted by the various sources of contamination which can lead to a hazardous future for the environment. The more problems that continue to build up, the more life and habitation that is being lost from these detrimental sources. It has become an increasingly scarier problem for Central Asia as the region continues to develop and advance. According to Shestak and Pobedinsky, there are ways to solve the environmental crisis happening in Central Asia like adding certain rules to legislation, creating more enforced laws for the government to uphold, and improving management over the decisions involved with the environment. Implementing certain regulations for the environment will create a space for more environmentally friendly discussions that will create more urgency to help save the environment. Adding laws in place will allow for more changes to be enforced and there will be a bigger urge to protect habitation and life within our ecosystem.

China 

According to Shen, Li, Wang, and Liao, the emission trading system that China had used for its environmentally friendly journey was implemented in certain districts and was successful in comparison to those which were used in test districts that were approved by the government. This shows how China tried to effectively introduce new innovative systems to impact the environment. China implemented multiple ways to combat environmental problems even if they didn't succeed at first. It led to them implementing a more successful process which benefited the environment. Although China needs to implement policies like, "The “fee-to-tax” process should be accelerated, however, and the design and implementation of the environmental tax system should be improved. This would form a positive incentive mechanism in which a low level of pollution correlates with a low level of tax." By implementing policies like these companies have a higher incentive to not over pollute the environment and instead focus on creating an eco-friendlier environment for their workplaces. In doing so, it will lead to less pollution being emitted while there also being a cleaner environment. Companies would prefer to have lower taxes to lessen the costs they have to deal with, so it encourages them to avoid polluting the environment as much as possible.

International 
Energy Star is a program with a primary goal of increasing energy efficiency and indirectly decreasing greenhouse gas emissions. Energy Star has different sections for different nations or areas, including the United States, the European Union and Australia. The program, which was founded in the United States, also exists in Canada, Japan, New Zealand, and Taiwan. Additionally, the United Nations Sustainable Development Goal 17 has a target to promote the development, transfer, dissemination, and diffusion of environmentally friendly technologies to developing countries as part of the 2030 Agenda.

See also 

Climate justice
Cradle-to-Cradle Design
Design for Environment
Ecolabel
Environmental Choice Program
Environmental enterprise
Environmental movement
Environmental organizations
Environmental protection
Environmentalism
Green brands
Green trading
Greenwashing
List of environmental issues
List of environmental organizations
List of environmental topics
Market-based instruments
Natural capital
Natural resource
Renewable energy
Sustainability
Sustainable products
Corporate sustainability

References 

Sustainable business
Sustainable technologies